The 1915 San Francisco Seals season was the 13th season in the history of the San Francisco Seals baseball team. The team won the Pacific Coast League (PCL) pennant with a 119–93 record. The season ran from April 3 to October 28, 1917.

Harry Wolverton began the season as the team's manager. On June 17, however, team owner Henry Berry fired Wolverton, stating that he could not get along with Wolverton in a business way. Jerry Downs took over as player-manager after Wolverton.

Pitcher Eric Erickson led the PCL in both wins (30) and earned run average (1.93).

1917 PCL standings

Statistics

Batting 
Note: Pos = Position; G = Games played; AB = At bats; H = Hits; Avg. = Batting average; HR = Home runs; SLG = Slugging percentage

Pitching 
Note: G = Games pitched; IP = Innings pitched; W = Wins; L = Losses; PCT = Win percentage; ERA = Earned run average; SO = Strikeouts

References

1917 in sports in California
Pacific Coast League seasons